Margaret McWade (born Margaret May Fish; September 3, 1871 –  April 1, 1956) was an American stage and film actress. She began her career in vaudeville in the early 1890s. Her most memorable role was as one of The Pixilated Sisters, a comedic stage act with actress Margaret Seddon. Later in 1936, they reprised their roles in the movie Mr. Deeds Goes to Town.

Biography
Margaret May Fish was born September 3, 1871 in Chicago, Illinois, the eldest of three daughters. A number of short biographies state that Fish was born in 1872; however, the 1900 U.S. Census reports her birth in 1871.

Career
During her early career, Margaret May Fish went by the stage name Margaret May. In the late 1890s, while performing in vaudeville, she met fellow actress Margaret Seddon. The two actresses teamed to create a stage act known as The Pixillated Sisters. The act proved to be a hit for the duo. Years later, they would reprise The Pixilated Sisters in the 1936 movie Mr. Deeds Goes to Town.

On September 4, 1897, Margaret married actor Edward McWade. Margaret and her husband appeared in a number of stage performances together in Boston and New York before their marriage. Their earliest stage appearance together was in March 1892 in Boston. They were cast as supporting characters in County Fair at the Whitney Opera House. Until late 1919, Margaret continued to use her stage name Margaret May.

Margaret McWade made her screen debut in the 1914 silent film The Drama of Heyville, starring Marc McDermott and directed by Ashley Miller. She was under contract to the Edison Film Company and was later picked up by the Vitagraph Film Company. She acted in a total of 59 films from 1914 to 1954.

Between films, she was a prolific stage actress, touring the U.S. with various theatrical companies. Margaret also toured in theater shows with her husband Edward, several which he wrote. In April 1901, Edward McWade wrote and produced the play Winchester at the American Theater in New York. The play was based upon an event during the Civil War. Edward McWade wrote a supporting role for his wife. In 1902, he wrote the play The Land of Mystery, a romantic drama in which Margaret also had a role.

In 1922, Margaret was cast in the movie The Blot, produced and directed by Lois Weber. The Blot is considered by many critics to be Weber's greatest film. McWade played Mrs. Griggs, and she is described in reviews as the, "old mother hubbard, shouldering most of the burden for the penny pinching family." The movie received critical acclaim, which paved the way for more acting roles. McWade most often was described as playing the mother, aunt, older sister, spinster, and later in her career, the grandmother. In the Louisiana newspaper Monroe Morning World on June 5, 1938, she is described physically as "the one with the angular face and black hair".

In 1935, producers approached both McWade and Seddon and asked them to reprise their roles as The Pixilated Sisters for the 1936 movie Mr. Deeds Goes to Town, starring Gary Cooper and directed by Frank Capra. In the film, the two actresses play sisters who believe that Cooper's character is "pixilated". Reprising these characters set off a brief firestorm of stage and film performances for the duo. In The Corsicana Daily Sun, McWade is quoted regarding having played the Pixilated Sisters in the movie: "it's a one chance in a million, like something out of a book. It's not hard to understand. It wasn't we who clicked individually or even collectively. It was a grand part. If you recall, we turned the tide by our testimony in favor of Gary Cooper at an insanity hearing. He was a beloved character, and by helping him we helped ourselves."

The two actresses teamed for a variety of films throughout the late 1930s and into the 1940s, often playing spinster sisters in comedic roles written for them, such as One Man's Bonus. After 1936, they often were billed in newspapers and posters as those "beloved Pixilated Sisters".

Later years and death
Two years after performing in her last movie, Margaret McWade died on April 1, 1956 in Los Angeles at the age of 83. She was buried in her hometown of Chicago, Illinois in Rosehill Cemetery.

Stage performances
 1892: The County Fair. The Whitney Opera House; Boston, MA; ** Edward McWade in production.
 1893: Comic Stage Sketches. Boston, MA; **Edward McWade in production.
 1901: Winchester. The American Theater, New York; Written by Edward McWade.
 1902: The Land of Mystery. New York Theater Company; New York; Written by husband Edward McWade.
 1912: Robert A. Hudson Theater; San Francisco, CA; New York Stage Production Company.
 1925: The Painted Lady.The William Fox Players. Touring theatrical show. Bar Harbor Maine.

Partial filmography

The Man Who Disappeared (1914, serial) - Landlady [Ch. 4]
Blue Jeans (1917) - Cindy Tutwiler
To Hell with the Kaiser! (1918)
Flower of the Dusk (1918) - Miriam
The Great Victory (1919) - Nurse Edith Cavell
The Broken Commandments (1919) - Mrs. Banard
When a Man Loves (1919) - Yaki
Stronger Than Death (1920) - Mrs. Boucicault
The Confession (1920) - Mrs. Bartlett
Shore Acres (1920) - Ann Berry, Martin's Wife
Alias Miss Dodd (1920) - Sarah Ross
 Darling Mine (1920) - Agnes McCarthy
Food for Scandal (1920) - Señora Maria Serra
 The Blue Moon (1920) - The Iron-gray Woman
Her Beloved Villain (1920) - Madame Bergomat
A Tale of Two Worlds (1921) - Attendant
The Foolish Matrons (1921) - Mrs. Eugenia Sheridan
The Blot (1921) - Mrs. Theodore Griggs
 Garments of Truth (1921) - Mrs. Crope
Her Mad Bargain (1921) - Mrs. Dunn
Alice Adams (1923) - Mrs. Adams
Broken Barriers (1924) - Mrs. Durland
The Cyclone Rider (1924) - Mrs. Armstrong
The Painted Lady (1924) - Mrs. Smith
Sundown (1924) - Mrs. Brent
The Lost World (1925) - Mrs. Challenger
White Fang (1925) - Mrs. Black
High Steppers (1926) - Mrs. Clancy
Women Who Dare (1928) - Mrs. Kelly
Una nueva y gloriosa nación (1928) - Balcarce's Mother
Manslaughter (1930) - Prison inmate (uncredited)
The Last Days of Pompeii (1935) - Calvus' Wife (uncredited)
Mr. Deeds Goes to Town (1936) - Amy (uncredited)
Postal Inspector (1936) - Old Maid - Mrs. Compton (uncredited)
Theodora Goes Wild (1936) - Aunt Elsie
Let's Make a Million (1936) - Aunt Lucy
Lost Horizon (1937) - Missionary (uncredited)
We Have Our Moments (1937) - Woman in Stateroom (uncredited)
Wings Over Honolulu (1937) - Nellie Curtis
Love in a Bungalow (1937) - Miss Lydia Bisbee
Danger: Love at Work (1937) - Aunt Patty
Forbidden Valley (1938) - Mrs. Scudd
Holiday (1938) - Farmer's Wife (scenes deleted)
Having Wonderful Time (1938) - Mrs. G (uncredited)
The Texans (1938) - Middle-Aged Lady (uncredited)
Service de Luxe (1938) - Small Towner (uncredited)
I Stole a Million (1939) - Matron (uncredited)
When Tomorrow Comes (1939) - Woman (uncredited)
The Hunchback of Notre Dame (1939) - Younger Sister (uncredited)
Framed (1940) - Nosy Woman (uncredited)
Strike Up the Band (1940) - Old Lady (scenes deleted)
Remedy for Riches (1940) - Gertrude Purdy
The Remarkable Andrew (1942) - Mrs. Ballard (uncredited)
Scattergood Survives a Murder (1942) - Lydia Quentin
The Meanest Man in the World (1943) - Lady with Umbrella (uncredited)
I Dood It (1943) - Woman in Front Row (uncredited)
The Man Who Dared (1946) - Mrs. Cheever (uncredited)
It's a Joke, Son! (1947) - Jennifer Whipple
Copacabana (1947) - Old Lady Witness (uncredited)
The Bishop's Wife (1947) - Miss Trumbull
It Should Happen to You (1954) - Elderly Lady at Macy's (uncredited)

References

External links

1871 births
1956 deaths
American film actresses
American silent film actresses
American stage actresses
20th-century American actresses
19th-century American actresses
Burials at Rosehill Cemetery